Urophora algerica is a species of tephritid or fruit flies in the genus Urophora of the family Tephritidae.

Distribution
France, Spain, Italy, Algeria.

References

Urophora
Insects described in 1941
Diptera of Europe
Diptera of Africa